The 52-floor Isbank (İş Bankası) Tower 1 is the tallest of the three skyscrapers of the Türkiye İş Bankası headquarters in Levent, Istanbul. It was formerly the tallest skyscraper in Turkey and the Balkan peninsula (southeastern Europe). It entered service with the ceremonies between August 23 and 26, 2000.

Specifications of the building
 Its official height is  without the flag pole, and  including the flag pole.
 Uses "intelligent skyscraper" technologies.
 Located close to the Levent subway station of the Istanbul Metro on Büyükdere Avenue. 
 Owned and built by Türkiye İş Bankası (Turkish Business Bank).
 Several details of the building resemble Trump Tower in New York City, which was designed by the same architect firm, Swanke Hayden Connell Architects. SHCA collaborated with the Turkish architect firm Tekeli-Sisa.

See also 
 Istanbul
 List of tallest buildings in Istanbul
List of tallest buildings in Turkey
List of tallest buildings in Europe

References

External links

 Emporis Buildings Database - Isbank Tower

2000 establishments in Turkey
Art Deco architecture in Turkey
Beşiktaş
Buildings and structures in Istanbul
Office buildings completed in 2000
Office buildings in Turkey
Skyscrapers in Istanbul
Skyscraper office buildings in Turkey